Kalami can refer to:

 Kalami language, spoken in Pakistan
 Kalami, Aptera, a village in Chania regional unit, Greece
 Kalami, Deliana, a village in Chania regional unit, Greece
 Kalami, Heraklion, a village in Heraklion regional unit, Greece
 Kalami, Corfu, a village in Corfu, Greece
 Kalami, Laconia, a village in Laconia, Greece
 Kalami, Messenia, a village in Messenia, Greece
 Kalami, Paros, a village in Paros, Greece